Adalbert Püllöck (6 January 1907 – 7 December 1977) was a Romanian footballer who played as a goalkeeper. He was born in Austria-Hungary (today Romania).

Biography 

At club level, he played in Liga I for Crişana Oradea.

With the Romania national football team, he was picked by joint coaches Josef Uridil and Costel Rădulescu to play in the 1934 World Cup in Italy. The team were eliminated in the first round of this competition after a 3–2 defeat to Czechoslovakia.

Notes and references 
 Evidence of Adalbert Püllöck's caps for Romania national football team
 

Romanian people of German descent
1907 births
1977 deaths
Romania international footballers
Romanian footballers
Liga I players
1934 FIFA World Cup players
Association football goalkeepers